Havildar Rajesh Kumar, AC was a Non Commissioned Officer (NCO) of Indian Army who was awarded India's highest military decoration Ashoka Chakra.

Early life
Rajesh Kumar was born in village Lath near Bhainswal Kalan Sonipat district in Haryana. He was the son of Shri Ram Kishan and Smt Parmeshwari. He joined the army after his initial education.

Military career
Kumar was recruited into 11 th battalion Rajputana Rifles, an infantry regiment with a glorious history of gallantry awards and battle honours.

On 1 August 2009, he was leading a section of the Ghatak team that was on a search mission for terrorists in the forests of Kupwara district of Jammu and Kashmir. He opened fire on the terrorists and killed three of them, saved his teammates, but got seriously hurt in the process. Finally he succumbed to injuries. He was posthumously awarded the Ashoka Chakra, the highest peacetime military decoration in India.

Ashoka Chakra awardee
The citation by the President of India during the awarding of the Ashoka Chakra read: Havildar Rajesh Kumar showed unparalleled feat of most conspicuous gallantry, fortitude and the rare spirit of self sacrifice in fighting the terrorists.

References

2009 deaths
Recipients of the Ashoka Chakra (military decoration)
Ashoka Chakra